Tommy Vail (born 1873) was a Scottish footballer who played as a centre forward with Lochgelly United, Dundee, Bolton Wanderers, Chatham United , Walsall, Bristol Rovers, Gainsborough Trinity, Doncaster Rovers and Dunfermline Athletic.

Playing career
Born in Auchterderran, Fife, he is first known to have played for his local club Lochgelly United, and then was signed by Dundee before moving to Division 1 team Bolton Wanderers after the start of the 1895–96 season where he scored once in 4 games.

After a failed trial at Oldham Athletic, in 1896 Vail moved south to Chatham United for two seasons in the Southern League.

The next season he was with Walsall of Division 2. In March, Small Heath unsuccessfully tried to get him on a loan. He ended the season as joint top scorer with 16 League goals as Walsall finished in 6th place.

The following season he moved to fellow Division 2 club Gainsborough Trinity.

For the 1900–01 season Vail went to play for Midland League side Doncaster Rovers, scoring 26 League and Cup goals, plus 5 in friendlies. He was also used as a trainer.

He then moved back to Scotland and played for his old club Lochgelly United, before a move in March 1903 to Dunfermline Athletic. He retired in 1905.

Personal life
Vail was born in 1873 in Auchterderran, Fife to Michael Vail and Ann Naysmith. He married Betsy Watson on 26 Oct 1898 in Auchterderran. Around 1901, whilst playing for Doncaster he also worked as a railway labourer. He died on  3 July 1940 in Buckhaven, Fife.

References

1873 births
1940 deaths
People from Lochgelly
Footballers from Fife
Scottish footballers
Association football forwards
Lochgelly United F.C. players
Dundee F.C. players
Bolton Wanderers F.C. players
Chatham Town F.C. players
Walsall F.C. players
Bristol Rovers F.C. players
Gainsborough Trinity F.C. players
Doncaster Rovers F.C. players
Dunfermline Athletic F.C. players
Scottish Football League players
English Football League players
Midland Football League players
Southern Football League players